The Frye Company is an American manufacturer of shoes, boots and leather accessories. Founded in 1863, it claims to be the oldest continuously operated American shoe company.

History
In 1863, John A. Frye opened the first Frye shop on Elm Street in Marlborough, Massachusetts. In the 1890s, Marlborough manufactured more shoes than any other city in the U.S. During that time, and Frye was one of the largest and most successful footwear companies in the entire country.

During the 1960s Frye made custom boots for Jackie Kennedy, Bing Crosby, Jerry Lewis, Barbra Streisand, Bette Midler, Ann-Margret, Walt Frazier, Stan Laurel and Oliver Hardy, Candice Bergen, Liza Minnelli, Carole King, Gene Autry, and President Richard Nixon.

The company also introduced the  Harness Boot in the 1960s, inspired by Union cavalry  in the Civil War.

In 1998, Frye was acquired by Jimlar from the Kravetz Group, a footwear company that produced Coach shoes under license. In 2010, Jimlar was acquired by Li & Fung. Li & Fung spun off its brand management as Global Brands Group in 2014.

Stores

The Frye Company opened its first retail store in 2011 in SoHo, New York City. In 2013, Frye opened stores on Newbury Street in Boston, Wisconsin Avenue in Washington, D.C., and Chicago.

In 2015, Frye opened stores at Ponce City Market in Atlanta, Roosevelt Field in Long Island, New York, NorthPark Center in Dallas, and Tysons Corner in Fairfax County, Virginia.

On March 27, 2020, all Frye Company retail stores were officially permanently closed.

Archives and records
J.A. Frye Shoe Company ledgers at Baker Library Special Collections, Harvard Business School.

See also
Allen Edmonds
Horween Leather Company

References

Extarnal links
 

Shoe companies of the United States
Manufacturing companies based in New York City
Manufacturing companies established in 1863
Companies that filed for Chapter 11 bankruptcy in 2021